The Roman Catholic  Diocese of Culiacán is a suffragan diocese of the Archdiocese of Hermosillo.

Bishops

Ordinaries
José de Jesús María Uriarte y Pérez (1883 — 1887) 
José María de Jesús Portugal y Serratos, O.F.M. (1888 — 1898), appointed Bishop of Saltillo, Coahuila
José Homobono Anaya y Gutiérrez (1898 — 1902), appointed Bishop of Chilapa, Guerrero
Francisco Uranga y Sáenz (1903 — 1919) 
Silviano Carrillo y Cardenas (1920 — 1921) 
Agustín Aguirre y Ramos (1922 — 1942) 
Lino Aguirre Garcia (1944 — 1969) 
Luis Rojas Mena (1969 — 1993)
Benjamín Jiménez Hernández (1993 — 2011) - Bishop Emeritus
Jonás Guerrero Corona (2011 —  )

Auxiliary bishops
 Luis Rojas Mena (1968-1969), appointed Bishop here
Jesús Humberto Velázquez Garay (1983-1988), appointed Bishop of Celaya, Guanajuato
Benjamín Jiménez Hernández (1989-1993), appointed Bishop here
Emigdio Duarte Figueroa (2007-2010)

Other priest of this diocese who became bishop
Jesús María Echavarría y Aguirre, appointed Bishop of Saltillo, Coahuila in 1904

Episcopal See
Culiacán, Sinaloa

External links and references

Culiacan
Culiacan, Roman Catholic Diocese of
Culiacan
Culiacan